Neldazosin is an α-adrenoreceptor antagonist.

References

Abandoned drugs
Alpha blockers